The 2013–14 Dynamo Moscow season was the 91st season in the club's history. They participated in the Russian Premier League, finishing 4th whilst also reaching the Fifth Round of Russian Cup, where they were defeated by Salyut Belgorod.

Dynamo started the season under the management of Dan Petrescu, who mutually terminated his contract with the club on 8 April 2014. Konstantin Paramonov was then put in temporary charge of the team before Stanislav Cherchesov was appointed Dynamos permanent manager on 10 April 2014.

Squad

Out on loan

Youth squad

Transfers

Summer

In:

Out:

Winter

In:

 

Out:

Competitions

Russian Premier League

Results by matchday

Matches

Table

Russian Cup

Statistics

Appearances and goals

|-
|colspan="14"|Players away from Dynamo on loan:

|-
|colspan="14"|Players who appeared for Dynamo no longer at the club:

|}

Scorers

Disciplinary record

Notes
Match was interrupted in the 86th minute with Dynamo leading 4-2 when Zenit fans ran out of the stands. At first they stood behind the goal line, when the referee decided to take the teams off the field into the dressing rooms and teams began to leave, one of Zenit fans punched Dynamo player Vladimir Granat, the match was then abandoned.

References

Dynamo Moscow
FC Dynamo Moscow seasons